White Swan Inn may refer to:

 White Swan Inn, Swan Creek, a heritage-listed former inn and now house, Queensland, Australia
 The White Swan Inn, Monmouth, Wales
 White Swan Inn, Norwich; see Norwich Company of Comedians
 The White Swan, Twickenham, England
 White Swan Hotel, Alnwick, Northumberland, England
 Swan Inn, London, England
 The Swan Inn, Ruislip, Middlesex, England
 White Swan Inn, San Francisco